There are more than 3,400 Tree Cities USA.

The following is a partial listing of Tree Cities USA.  To be a Tree City, the community must meet four standards set by the National Arbor Day Foundation and the National Association of State Foresters:
 The community must have a tree board or department.
 The community must have established a community ordinance for tree care.
 There must be a community forestry program with an annual budget of at least $2 per capita.
 The community must have an Arbor Day observance and proclamation.

States

Alabama 
Abbeville, Alabama
Alabaster, Alabama
Auburn, Alabama
Bay Minette, Alabama
Birmingham, Alabama
Daphne, Alabama
Demopolis, Alabama
Elberta, Alabama
Fairhope, Alabama
Florence, Alabama
Foley, Alabama
Gulf Shores, Alabama
Huntsville, Alabama
Leeds, Alabama
Loxley, Alabama
Madison, Alabama
Magnolia Springs, Alabama
Mobile, Alabama
Orange Beach, Alabama
Robertsdale, Alabama
Silverhill, Alabama
Valley, Alabama

Alaska 
Anchorage, Alaska
Juneau, Alaska
Sitka, Alaska

Arizona 
Avondale, Arizona
Buckeye, Arizona
Camp Verde, Arizona
Casa Grande, Arizona
Chandler, Arizona
Coolidge, Arizona
Gilbert, Arizona
Glendale, Arizona
Kingman, Arizona
Lake Havasu City, Arizona
Litchfield Park, Arizona
Mesa, Arizona
Patagonia, Arizona
Peoria, Arizona
Phoenix, Arizona
Pinetop-Lakeside, Arizona
Prescott Valley, Arizona
Quartzsite, Arizona
Scottsdale, Arizona
Show Low, Arizona
Tempe, Arizona
Tucson, Arizona

Arkansas 
Bentonville, Arkansas
Eureka Springs, Arkansas
Little Rock, Arkansas
Mineral Springs, Arkansas

California 
Alhambra, California
Anaheim, California
Bakersfield, California
Beverly Hills, California
Brentwood, California
Burbank, California
Calabasas, California
Cerritos, California
Chico, California
Claremont, California
Coronado, California
Corona, California
Costa Mesa, California
Culver City, California
Davis, California
Fremont, California
Fullerton, California
Gilroy, California
Hayward, California
Hemet, California
Irvine, California
Lakewood, California
Lodi, California
Los Angeles, California
Martinez, California
Menlo Park, California
Merced, California
Mission Viejo, California
Monterey, California
Modesto, California
Napa, California
Oakland, California
Orange, California
Pasadena, California
Poway, California
Sacramento, California
St. Helena, California
Seaside, California
San Dimas, California
San Fernando, California
San Francisco, California
San Jose, California
San Leandro, California
San Ramon, California
Santa Clara, California
Santa Clarita, California
Saratoga, California
Santee, California
South Pasadena, California
Upland, California
Woodland, California

Colorado 
Arvada, Colorado
Aurora, Colorado
Boulder, Colorado
Colorado Springs, Colorado
Denver, Colorado
Elizabeth, Colorado
Evans, Colorado
Fort Collins, Colorado
Greeley, Colorado
Longmont, Colorado
Parker, Colorado
Pierce, Colorado
Sterling, Colorado
Wheat Ridge, Colorado

Connecticut 
Bridgeport, Connecticut
Danbury, Connecticut
Easton, Connecticut
Fairfield, Connecticut
Hartford, Connecticut
Middletown, Connecticut
Norwalk, Connecticut
Stamford, Connecticut

Delaware 
Reference
Arden, Delaware
Ardentown, Delaware
Bethany Beach, Delaware
Dover, Delaware
Dover AFB, Delaware
Georgetown, Delaware
Henlopen Acres, Delaware
Lewes, Delaware
Milford, Delaware
Newark, Delaware
Ocean View, Delaware
Rehoboth Beach, Delaware
Smyrna, Delaware
Wilmington, Delaware

District of Columbia 
Washington, D.C.

Florida 
Altamonte Springs, Florida
Apopka, Florida
Aventura, Florida
Belleair, Florida
Boca Raton, Florida
Boynton Beach, Florida
Bradenton, Florida
Brooksville, Florida
Bushnell, Florida
Cape Canaveral, Florida
Cape Coral, Florida
Clearwater, Florida
Coconut Creek, Florida
Cooper City, Florida
Coral Gables, Florida
Coral Springs, Florida
Crescent City, Florida
Crystal River, Florida
Davie, Florida
Daytona Beach, Florida
DeLand, Florida
Destin, Florida
Doral, Florida
Dunedin, Florida
Eustis, Florida
Fort Lauderdale, Florida
Fort Myers Beach, Florida
Fort Myers, Florida
Fort Pierce, Florida
Fort Walton Beach, Florida
Gainesville, Florida
Golden Beach, Florida
Green Cove Springs, Florida
Greenacres, Florida
Gulf Breeze, Florida
Gulfport, Florida
Hallandale, Florida
Hollywood, Florida
Hurlburt Field, Florida
Inverness, Florida
Interlachen, Florida
Jacksonville Beach, Florida
Jacksonville, Florida
Juno Beach, Florida
Jupiter, Florida
Keystone Heights, Florida
Key West, Florida
Lady Lake, Florida
Lake Park, Florida
Lakeland, Florida
Lantana, Florida
Largo, Florida
Lauderhill, Florida
Leesburg, Florida
Leon County, Florida
Lighthouse Point, Florida
Lynn Haven, Florida
MacDill Air Force Base, Florida
Maitland, Florida
Margate, Florida
Marianna, Florida
Melbourne, Florida
Miami Beach, Florida
Miami Gardens, Florida
Miami Springs, Florida
Miami, Florida
Milton, Florida
Monticello, Florida
Mount Dora, Florida
Naples, Florida
NAS Whiting Field, Florida
Neptune Beach, Florida
New Port Richey, Florida
Niceville, Florida
North Miami Beach, Florida
North Miami, Florida
Oakland Park, Florida
Oakland, Florida
Ocala, Florida
Oldsmar, Florida
Orange County, Florida
Orange Park, Florida
Orlando, Florida
Ormond Beach, Florida
Oviedo, Florida
Palatka, Florida
Palm Beach Gardens, Florida
Palm Beach Shores, Florida
Palm Coast, Florida
Palm Springs, Florida
Panama City, Florida
Parkland, Florida
Patrick Space Force Base, Florida
Pembroke Pines, Florida
Pensacola, Florida
Pensacola Naval Air Station, Florida
Perry, Florida
Pinellas Park, Florida
Plantation, Florida
Pomona Park, Florida
Pompano Beach, Florida
Ponce Inlet, Florida
Port Orange, Florida
Port St. Lucie, Florida
Punta Gorda, Florida
Rockledge, Florida
Royal Palm Beach, Florida
Safety Harbor, Florida
St. Augustine Beach, Florida
St. Augustine, Florida
St. Pete Beach, Florida
St. Petersburg, Florida
San Antonio, Florida
Sanford, Florida
Sanibel, Florida
Sarasota County, Florida
Sarasota, Florida
Seminole, Florida
Sewall's Point, Florida
South Pasadena, Florida
Sunrise, Florida
Tallahassee, Florida
Tamarac, Florida
Tampa, Florida
Tarpon Springs, Florida
Temple Terrace, Florida
Titusville, Florida
Treasure Island, Florida
Vero Beach, Florida
Wellington, Florida
West Palm Beach, Florida
Wildwood, Florida
Windermere, Florida
Winter Haven, Florida
Winter Park, Florida
Winter Springs, Florida
Zephyrhills, Florida

Georgia 
Athens-Clarke County, Georgia
Ball Ground, Georgia
Berkeley Lake, Georgia
Bethlehem, Georgia
Clayton, Georgia
Columbus, Georgia
Duluth, Georgia
Madison, Georgia
Newnan, Georgia
Roswell, Georgia
Savannah, Georgia
Suwanee, Georgia

Hawaii 
Honolulu, Hawaii
Mililani Town, Hawaii
Schofield Barracks, Hawaii

Idaho 
Aberdeen, Idaho
Boise, Idaho
Caldwell, Idaho
Coeur D'Alene, Idaho
Pocatello, Idaho

Illinois 
Aurora, Illinois
Berwyn, Illinois
Brookfield, Illinois
Carbondale, Illinois
Chicago, Illinois
Elmhurst, Illinois
Evanston, Illinois
Glen Ellyn, Illinois
Glenview, Illinois
Highland, Illinois
Hinsdale, Illinois
Lake Forest, Illinois
Lombard, Illinois
Lockport, Illinois
Lindenhurst, Illinois
Mackinaw, Illinois
Mokena, Illinois
Morton Grove, Illinois
Mount Carroll, Illinois
Mount Prospect, Illinois
Niles, Illinois
Oak Park, Illinois
Park Ridge, Illinois
Quincy, Illinois
River Grove, Illinois
River Forest, Illinois
South Elgin, Illinois
Streamwood, Illinois
Urbana, Illinois
Wilmette, Illinois

Indiana 
Anderson, Indiana
Angola, Indiana
Auburn, Indiana
Bedford, Indiana
Beech Grove, Indiana
Berne, Indiana
Bloomington, Indiana
Carmel, Indiana
Chesterton, Indiana
Columbia City, Indiana
Crown Point, Indiana
Culver, Indiana
Decatur, Indiana
Delphi, Indiana
East Chicago, Indiana
Edgewood, Indiana
Elkhart, Indiana
Evansville, Indiana
Fortville, Indiana
Fort Wayne, Indiana
Fremont, Indiana
Goshen, Indiana
Greencastle, Indiana
Greendale, Indiana
Greenfield, Indiana
Grissom Air Reserve Base, Indiana
Huntington, Indiana
Indianapolis, Indiana
La Porte, Indiana
Lafayette, Indiana
Middlebury, Indiana
Madison, Indiana
Michigan City, Indiana
Mishawaka, Indiana
Mitchell, Indiana
Montpelier, Indiana
Mount Ayr, Indiana
Muncie, Indiana
Munster, Indiana
Nappanee, Indiana
Nashville, Indiana
New Harmony, Indiana
Newport, Indiana
Noblesville, Indiana
North Manchester, Indiana
Rensselaer, Indiana
Richmond, Indiana
Rochester, Indiana
Salem, Indiana
South Bend, Indiana
Syracuse, Indiana
Terre Haute, Indiana
Tipton, Indiana
Valparaiso, Indiana
West Lafayette, Indiana
Whiting, Indiana
Winamac, Indiana
Zionsville, Indiana

Iowa 
Ames, Iowa
Clive, Iowa
De Witt, Iowa
Greene, Iowa
Pleasant Hill, Iowa

Kansas 
Anthony, Kansas
Clay Center, Kansas
De Soto, Kansas
Ottawa, Kansas
Salina, Kansas

Kentucky 
Anchorage, Kentucky
Ashland, Kentucky
Bowling Green, Kentucky
Durham, Kentucky
Lexington, Kentucky
Russellville, Kentucky

Louisiana
Abita Springs, Louisiana
New Orleans, Louisiana

Maine 
Augusta, Maine
Auburn, Maine
Bath, Maine
Bangor, Maine
Dover-Foxcroft, Maine
Farmington, Maine
Hampden, Maine
Kennebunkport, Maine
Portland, Maine
South Portland, Maine
Westbrook, Maine
Yarmouth, Maine

Maryland 
Baltimore, Maryland
Berwyn Heights, Maryland
Boonsboro, Maryland
Ellicott City, Maryland
Frederick, Maryland
Hyattsville, Maryland
La Plata, Maryland
Takoma Park, Maryland
University Park, Maryland

Massachusetts 
Acton, Massachusetts
Arlington, Massachusetts
Billerica, Massachusetts
Boston, Massachusetts
Cohasset, Massachusetts
Dalton, Massachusetts
Dedham, Massachusetts
Hinsdale, Massachusetts
Lynnfield, Massachusetts
Medfield, Massachusetts
Medford, Massachusetts
Nantucket, Massachusetts
Pittsfield, Massachusetts
Saugus, Massachusetts
Wakefield, Massachusetts
Wilmington, Massachusetts
Woburn, Massachusetts

Michigan 
Adrian, Michigan
Albion, Michigan
Allegan, Michigan
Alma, Michigan
Alpena, Michigan
Ann Arbor, Michigan
Auburn Hills, Michigan
Battle Creek, Michigan
Bay City, Michigan
Belding, Michigan
Berkley, Michigan
Big Rapids, Michigan
Birmingham, Michigan
Boyne City, Michigan
Breckenridge, Michigan
Brighton, Michigan
Buchanan, Michigan
Cadillac, Michigan
Caledonia, Michigan
Charlevoix, Michigan
Charlotte, Michigan
Clare, Michigan
Clawson, Michigan
Clio, Michigan
Coldwater, Michigan
Davison, Michigan
Dearborn Heights, Michigan
Dearborn, Michigan
Detroit, Michigan
Dewitt, Michigan
Dowagiac, Michigan
Dundee, Michigan
East Grand Rapids, Michigan
East Lansing, Michigan
Eastpointe, Michigan
Evart, Michigan
Escanaba, Michigan
Ferndale, Michigan
Frankenmuth, Michigan
Frankfort, Michigan
Franklin, Michigan
Fraser, Michigan
Fremont, Michigan
Dexter, Michigan
Gaylord, Michigan
Gladstone, Michigan
Grand Blanc, Michigan
Grand Haven, Michigan
Grand Rapids, Michigan
Grosse Pointe Farms, Michigan
Grosse Pointe Park, Michigan
Grosse Pointe Shores, Michigan
Grosse Pointe Woods, Michigan
Grosse Pointe, Michigan
Hillsdale, Michigan
Holland, Michigan
Holly, Michigan
Howard City, Michigan
Huntington Woods, Michigan
Imlay City, Michigan
Ionia, Michigan
Jackson, Michigan
Kalamazoo, Michigan
Lake Odessa, Michigan
Lansing, Michigan
Lapeer, Michigan
Lathrup Village, Michigan
Lincoln Park, Michigan
Livonia, Michigan
Lowell, Michigan
Mackinaw City, Michigan
Manistee, Michigan
Marquette, Michigan
Marshall, Michigan
Marysville, Michigan
Mason, Michigan
Milford, Michigan
Midland, Michigan
Montague, Michigan
Morenci, Michigan
Mount Clemens, Michigan
Muskegon, Michigan
Northville, Michigan
Novi, Michigan
Oak Park, Michigan
Petersburg, Michigan
Plainwell, Michigan
Port Huron, Michigan
Portage, Michigan
Portland, Michigan
Richland, Michigan
River Rouge, Michigan
Riverview, Michigan
Rochester Hills, Michigan
Royal Oak, Michigan
Roseville, Michigan
Saginaw, Michigan
St. Clair Shores, Michigan
St. Clair, Michigan
Saline, Michigan
Howell, Michigan
Saugatuck, Michigan
Shelby Charter Township, Michigan
South Haven, Michigan
South Lyon, Michigan
Southfield, Michigan
Southgate, Michigan
Sparta, Michigan
Spring Lake, Michigan
Sterling Heights, Michigan
Sturgis, Michigan
Taylor, Michigan
Tecumseh, Michigan
Traverse City, Michigan
Trenton, Michigan
Troy, Michigan
Wayne, Michigan
Westland, Michigan
Whitehall, Michigan
Zeeland, Michigan

Minnesota 
Ada, Minnesota
Eagan, Minnesota
Chanhassen, Minnesota
Eden Prairie, Minnesota
Minneapolis, Minnesota
Rice, Minnesota
Rochester, Minnesota
Savage, Minnesota
Wayzata, Minnesota

Mississippi 
Hattiesburg, Mississippi
Laurel, Mississippi
Ridgeland, Mississippi

Missouri 
Ellisville, Missouri
Hannibal, Missouri
Mexico, Missouri
Shrewsbury, Missouri
St. Louis, Missouri
University City, Missouri
Rolla, Missouri

Montana 
Billings, Montana
Bozeman, Montana
Kalispell, Montana
Whitefish, Montana
Whitehall, Montana

Nebraska 
Alliance, Nebraska 
Cozad, Nebraska
Imperial, Nebraska
Lincoln, Nebraska
Nebraska City, Nebraska
Ralston, Nebraska
Yutan, Nebraska

Nevada 
Henderson, Nevada
Incline Village, Nevada
Las Vegas, Nevada
Minden, Nevada

New Hampshire 
Concord, New Hampshire
Manchester, New Hampshire
Nashua, New Hampshire
Franklin, New Hampshire
Lebanon, New Hampshire
Enfield, New Hampshire 
Exeter, New Hampshire
Portsmouth, New Hampshire
Somersworth, New Hampshire 
Rochester, New Hampshire
Dover, New Hampshire
Durham, New Hampshire
Hanover, New Hampshire
Keene, New Hampshire
Plymouth, New Hampshire
New London, New Hampshire 
Newbury, New Hampshire
Laconia, New Hampshire
Wolfeboro, New Hampshire

New Jersey 
Asbury Park, New Jersey
Bayonne, New Jersey 
East Brunswick, New Jersey
Hamilton Square, New Jersey
Ho-Ho-Kus, New Jersey
Leonia, New Jersey
Madison, New Jersey
Matawan, New Jersey
Kearny, New Jersey
Merchantville, New Jersey
Morris Plains, New Jersey
Nutley, New Jersey
Paramus, New Jersey
Parsippany-Troy Hills, New Jersey
Princeton, New Jersey
Riverton, New Jersey
Stafford Township, New Jersey
Secaucus, New Jersey
Swedesboro, New Jersey
Trenton, New Jersey
Upper Saddle River, New Jersey

New Mexico 
Carlsbad, New Mexico
Santa Fe, New Mexico

New York 
Albany, New York
Amityville, New York
Baxter Estates, New York
Beacon, New York
Bellerose, New York
Bergen, New York
Binghamton, New York
Brighton, Monroe County, New York
Town of Brookhaven, New York
Buffalo, New York
Castleton-on-Hudson, New York
Cornwall, New York
DeWitt, New York
East Rochester, New York
Ellicottville, New York
Floral Park, New York
Flower Hill, New York
Garden City, New York
Glens Falls, New York
Great Neck Estates, New York
Head of the Harbor, New York
Huntington, New York
Ithaca, New York
Irondequoit, New York
Lindenhurst, New York
Lynbrook, New York
Malverne, New York
Manorhaven, New York
New Hyde Park, New York
New York City, New York
North Hempstead, New York
Norwich, New York
Oxford, New York
Pawling, New York
Rockville Centre, New York
Rye Brook, New York
Sands Point, New York
Upper Brookville, New York
Walden, New York
Watertown, New York
Wellsville, New York
Westhampton Beach, New York

North Carolina 
Asheville, North Carolina
Ayden, North Carolina
Brevard, North Carolina
Carrboro, North Carolina
Charlotte, North Carolina
Edenton, North Carolina
Farmville, North Carolina
Hendersonville, North Carolina
Jacksonville, North Carolina
Laurinburg, North Carolina
Marion, North Carolina
Mooresville, North Carolina
Salisbury, North Carolina
Southern Pines, North Carolina
Wake Forest, North Carolina
Weaverville, North Carolina

North Dakota 
Arthur, North Dakota
Bismarck, North Dakota
Bottineau, North Dakota
Cando, North Dakota
Carrington, North Dakota
Casselton, North Dakota
Cavalier, North Dakota
Cavalier Space Force Station, North Dakota
Devils Lake, North Dakota
Ellendale, North Dakota
Fargo, North Dakota
Garrison, North Dakota
Grafton, North Dakota
Gwinner, North Dakota
Harvey, North Dakota
Hatton, North Dakota
Hazen, North Dakota
Jamestown, North Dakota
Lakota, North Dakota
Langdon, North Dakota
Lankin, North Dakota
Larimore, North Dakota
Lincoln, North Dakota
Lisbon, North Dakota
Mandan, North Dakota
McVille, North Dakota
Milnor, North Dakota
Minot, North Dakota
Mohall, North Dakota
New Rockland, North Dakota
Northwood, North Dakota
Oakes, North Dakota
Pekin, North Dakota
Rugby, North Dakota
Rutland, North Dakota
Sibley, North Dakota
Tower City, North Dakota
Towner, North Dakota
Valley City, North Dakota
Wahpeton, North Dakota
Walhalla, North Dakota
Washburn, North Dakota
West Fargo, North Dakota
Wishek, North Dakota
Wyndmere, North Dakota

Ohio 
Ada, Ohio
Akron, Ohio
Alliance, Ohio
Amberley, Ohio
Amsterdam, Ohio
Archbold, Ohio
Ashland, Ohio
Athens, Ohio
Attica, Ohio
Aurora, Ohio
Avon Lake, Ohio
Baltic, Ohio
Baltimore, Ohio
Bay Village, Ohio
Beachwood, Ohio
Bedford Heights, Ohio
Bedford, Ohio
Belle Center, Ohio
Bellefontaine, Ohio
Bellevue, Ohio
Bellville, Ohio
Belpre, Ohio
Berea, Ohio
Bexley, Ohio
Bloomdale, Ohio
Bloomville, Ohio
Bluffton, Ohio
Bolivar, Ohio
Bowling Green, Ohio
Brecksville, Ohio
Brewster, Ohio
Brooklyn, Ohio
Broadview Heights, Ohio
Brunswick, Ohio
Bryan, Ohio
Burton, Ohio
Chillicothe, Ohio
Cincinnati, Ohio
Cleveland, Ohio
Cleveland Heights, Ohio
Coldwater, Ohio
Columbus, Ohio
Conneaut, Ohio
Dayton, Ohio
Delaware, Ohio
Dublin, Ohio
East Palestine, Ohio
Eastlake, Ohio
Fairfield, Ohio
Fairview Park, Ohio
Findlay, Ohio
Fremont, Ohio
Gambier, Ohio
Hamilton, Ohio
Hilliard, Ohio
Kent, Ohio
Kettering, Ohio
Louisville, Ohio
Lakewood, Ohio
Loveland, Ohio
Montpelier, Ohio
New London, Ohio
North Baltimore, Ohio
Norwalk, Ohio
Oxford, Ohio
Parma Heights, Ohio
Perry, Ohio
Rocky River, Ohio
Springfield, Ohio
Tiffin, Ohio
Toledo, Ohio
Upper Arlington, Ohio
Versailles, Ohio
Westerville, Ohio
Wooster, Ohio
Wyoming, Ohio
Youngstown, Ohio
Zanesville, Ohio
Zoar, Ohio

Oklahoma 
Ada, Oklahoma
Bartlesville, Oklahoma
Midwest City, Oklahoma
Norman, Oklahoma
Oklahoma City, Oklahoma
Pauls Valley, Oklahoma

Oregon 
Albany, Oregon
Ashland, Oregon
Aumsville, Oregon
Baker City, Oregon
Bandon, Oregon
Banks, Oregon
Beaverton, Oregon
Bend, Oregon
Brownsville, Oregon
Cannon Beach, Oregon
Central Point, Oregon
Coburg, Oregon
Coos Bay, Oregon
Corvallis, Oregon
Cottage Grove, Oregon
Creswell, Oregon
Dallas, Oregon
Eagle Point, Oregon
Echo, Oregon
Eugene, Oregon
Falls City, Oregon
Forest Grove, Oregon
Gervais, Oregon
Grants Pass, Oregon
Gresham, Oregon
Happy Valley, Oregon
Hillsboro, Oregon
Hood River, Oregon
Independence, Oregon
Klamath Falls, Oregon
La Grande, Oregon
Lake Oswego, Oregon
Lebanon, Oregon
Lincoln City, Oregon
Madras, Oregon
McMinnville, Oregon
Medford, Oregon
Milwaukie, Oregon
Monmouth, Oregon
Newport, Oregon
Oregon City, Oregon
Pendleton, Oregon
Philomath, Oregon
Portland, Oregon
Redmond, Oregon
Rivergrove, Oregon
Rogue River, Oregon
Roseburg, Oregon
Salem, Oregon
Sandy, Oregon
Seaside, Oregon
Sherwood, Oregon
Sisters, Oregon
Stanfield, Oregon
Sunriver, Oregon
Sweet Home, Oregon
Talent, Oregon
Tigard, Oregon
Tillamook, Oregon
Toledo, Oregon
Troutdale, Oregon
Tualatin, Oregon
Sandy, Oregon
Umatilla, Oregon
Veneta, Oregon
West Linn, Oregon
Wilsonville, Oregon

Pennsylvania 
Allentown, Pennsylvania
Athens, Pennsylvania
Beaver, Pennsylvania
Bensalem, Pennsylvania
Bernville, Pennsylvania
Bethlehem, Pennsylvania
Blairsville, Pennsylvania
Bloomsburg, Pennsylvania
Boyertown, Pennsylvania
Carbondale, Pennsylvania
Carlisle, Pennsylvania
Chambersburg, Pennsylvania
Cheltenham Township, Pennsylvania
Clarks Green, Pennsylvania
Clarks Summit, Pennsylvania
Columbia, Pennsylvania
Corry, Pennsylvania
Crafton, Pennsylvania
Denver, Pennsylvania
Derry, Pennsylvania
Doylestown, Pennsylvania
Eagles Mere, Pennsylvania
East Stroudsburg, Pennsylvania
Easton, Pennsylvania
Edinboro, Pennsylvania
Emporium, Pennsylvania
Erie, Pennsylvania
Factoryville, Pennsylvania
Forest Hills, Pennsylvania
Fountain Hill, Pennsylvania
Gratz, Pennsylvania
Greensburg, Pennsylvania
Hanover, Pennsylvania
Harrisburg, Pennsylvania
Highspire, Pennsylvania
Hollidaysburg, Pennsylvania
Hummelstown, Pennsylvania
Huntingdon, Pennsylvania
Jermyn, Pennsylvania
Kingston, Pennsylvania
Lancaster, Pennsylvania
Lansdowne, Pennsylvania
Laporte, Pennsylvania
Lehighton, Pennsylvania
Lemoyne, Pennsylvania
Lewisburg, Pennsylvania
Lower Merion, Pennsylvania
Marcus Hook, Pennsylvania
Meadville, Pennsylvania
Media, Pennsylvania
Mifflinburg, Pennsylvania
Milford, Pennsylvania
Moscow, Pennsylvania
Mount Lebanon, Pennsylvania
Muncy, Pennsylvania
Nazareth, Pennsylvania
Newtown, Pennsylvania
Nicholson, Pennsylvania
Oil City, Pennsylvania
Olyphant, Pennsylvania
Paxtang, Pennsylvania
Philadelphia, Pennsylvania
Pittsburgh, Pennsylvania
Pottsville, Pennsylvania
Radnor, Pennsylvania
Reading, Pennsylvania
Ridley Park, Pennsylvania
Robesonia, Pennsylvania
St. Mary's, Pennsylvania
Sayre, Pennsylvania
Schuylkill Haven, Pennsylvania
Sheffield, Pennsylvania
Shillington, Pennsylvania
Shinglehouse, Pennsylvania
South Williamsport, Pennsylvania
Southmont, Pennsylvania
Springfield, Pennsylvania
State College, Pennsylvania
Stroudsburg, Pennsylvania
Summit Hill, Pennsylvania
Swarthmore, Pennsylvania
Titusville, Pennsylvania
Tunkhannock, Pennsylvania
Upper Darby, Pennsylvania
Upper Dublin Township, Pennsylvania
Upper Merion, Pennsylvania
Warren, Pennsylvania
Weatherly, Pennsylvania
Wellsboro, Pennsylvania
Wernersville, Pennsylvania
West Chester, Pennsylvania
West Pittston, Pennsylvania
Westmont, Pennsylvania
Whitemarsh Township, Pennsylvania
Whitpain Township, Pennsylvania
Wilkes-Barre, Pennsylvania
Williamsport, Pennsylvania
Wyalusing, Pennsylvania
Wyomissing, Pennsylvania
York, Pennsylvania

Rhode Island 
Barrington, Rhode Island
Bristol, Rhode Island
Central Falls, Rhode Island
East Providence, Rhode Island
Jamestown, Rhode Island
Middletown, Rhode Island
Narragansett, Rhode Island
Newport, Rhode Island
Portsmouth, Rhode Island
Providence, Rhode Island
Warren, Rhode Island 
Warwick, Rhode Island 
West Warwick, Rhode Island

South Carolina 
Charleston, South Carolina
Cheraw, South Carolina
Columbia, South Carolina
Conway, South Carolina
Shaw AFB, South Carolina

South Dakota 
Aberdeen, South Dakota
Brookings, South Dakota
Huron, South Dakota
Lead, South Dakota
Mitchell, South Dakota
Pierre, South Dakota
Rapid City, South Dakota
Sioux Falls, South Dakota
Yankton, South Dakota

Tennessee 
Alcoa, Tennessee
Athens, Tennessee
Bell Buckle, Tennessee
Brentwood, Tennessee
Bristol, Tennessee
Clarksville, Tennessee
Cleveland, Tennessee
Collierville, Tennessee
Cookeville, Tennessee
Crossville, Tennessee
Fairview, Tennessee
Franklin, Tennessee
Gatlinburg, Tennessee
Germantown, Tennessee
Harrogate, Tennessee
Jackson, Tennessee
Johnson City, Tennessee
Jonesborough, Tennessee
Kingsport, Tennessee
Knoxville, Tennessee
Lakeland, Tennessee
Livingston, Tennessee
Maryville, Tennessee
McMinnville, Tennessee
Morristown, Tennessee
Chattanooga, Tennessee
Nashville, Tennessee
Norris, Tennessee
Oak Ridge, Tennessee
Pigeon Forge, Tennessee
Pulaski, Tennessee
Rogersville, Tennessee
Sevierville, Tennessee
Sewanee, Tennessee
Sparta, Tennessee
Sweetwater, Tennessee
Tullahoma, Tennessee

Texas 
Addison, Texas
Amarillo, Texas
Argyle, Texas
Dallas, Texas
Euless, Texas
Fort Worth, Texas
Frisco, Texas
Garland, Texas
Houston, Texas
Lake Jackson, Texas
Lancaster, Texas
Lubbock, Texas
Mesquite, Texas
Pflugerville, Texas
Plano, Texas
San Antonio, Texas
Trophy Club, Texas
Tyler, Texas
Waco, Texas

Utah 
Highland, Utah
Murray, Utah
Oak City, Utah
Springville, Utah

Vermont 
Burlington, Vermont
Essex Junction, Vermont
Shelburne, Vermont

Virginia 
Abingdon, Virginia
Falls Church, Virginia
Lynchburg, Virginia
Warrenton, Virginia
Marion, Virginia
Purcellville, Virginia
Reston, Virginia
Virginia Beach, Virginia
Herndon, Virginia
Leesburg, Virginia

Washington 
Airway Heights, Washington
Anacortes, Washington
Arlington, Washington
Auburn, Washington
Bainbridge Island, Washington
Bellevue, Washington
Bellingham, Washington
Bonney Lake, Washington
Bothell, Washington
Bremerton, Washington
Burien, Washington
Cashmere, Washington
Centralia, Washington
Chelan, Washington
Cheney, Washington
City of College Place, Washington
Clyde Hill, Washington
Colfax, Washington
Colville, Washington
Connell, Washington
Coulee Dam, Washington
Covington, Washington
Dupont, Washington
Duvall, Washington
Edmonds, Washington
Ellensburg, Washington
Entiat, Washington
Enumclaw, Washington
Everett, Washington
Fairchild AFB, Washington
Fairfield, Washington
Fife, Washington
George, Washington
Grandview, Washington
Hoquiam, Washington
Issaquah, Washington
Kennewick, Washington
Kent, Washington
Kirkland, Washington
Lacey, Washington
Lake Forest Park, Washington
Longview, Washington
Lynnwood, Washington
Medina, Washington
Mercer Island, Washington
Millwood, Washington
Monroe, Washington
Mountlake Terrace, Washington
Newcastle, Washington
North Bend, Washington
Oak Harbor, Washington
Okanogan, Washington
Olympia, Washington
Omak, Washington
Oroville, Washington
Pasco, Washington
Pateros, Washington
Port Angeles, Washington
Port Townsend, Washington
Poulsbo, Washington
Pullman, Washington
Redmond, Washington
Renton, Washington
Richland, Washington
Ritzville, Washington
Rockford, Washington
Sea Tac, Washington
Seattle, Washington
Sequim, Washington
Shoreline, Washington
Snoqualmie, Washington
Spokane, Washington
Steilacoom, Washington
Sumner, Washington
Tacoma, Washington
Tonasket, Washington
Town of Friday Harbor, Washington
Town of Hunts Point, Washington
Tukwila, Washington
Tumwater, Washington
Twisp, Washington
University Place, Washington
Vancouver, Washington
Walla Walla, Washington
Waterville, Washington
Wenatchee, Washington
White Salmon, Washington
Woodinville, Washington
Woodland, Washington
Woodway, Washington
Yakima, Washington
Yarrow Point, Washington
Yelm, Washington

West Virginia 
Bluefield, West Virginia
Berkeley Springs, West Virginia
Charles Town, West Virginia
Elkins, West Virginia
Follansbee, West Virginia
Harpers Ferry, West Virginia
Hinton, West Virginia
Lewisburg, West Virginia
Moorefield, West Virginia
Morgantown, West Virginia
Parkersburg, West Virginia
Petersburg, West Virginia
Ronceverte, West Virginia
Shepherdstown, West Virginia
Summersville, West Virginia
Williamstown, West Virginia

Wisconsin 
Appleton, Wisconsin
Beloit, Wisconsin
Eau Claire, Wisconsin
Edgar, Wisconsin
Fitchburg, Wisconsin
Fox Point, Wisconsin
Janesville, Wisconsin
Kenosha, Wisconsin
Madison, Wisconsin
Milton, Wisconsin
Cedarburg, Wisconsin
La Crosse, Wisconsin
Milwaukee, Wisconsin
Oconomowoc, Wisconsin
Plymouth, Wisconsin
Sturgeon Bay, Wisconsin
Thiensville, Wisconsin
Two Rivers, Wisconsin
Waukesha, Wisconsin
Wauwatosa, Wisconsin

Wyoming 
Green River, Wyoming

See also
List of Tree Cities in Ohio
Tree Cities of the World

References

External links

Lists of cities in the United States
Forestry-related lists
Forestry in the United States
United States environment-related lists